Emilio Serrano y Ruiz (13 March 1850 – 8 April 1939) was a Spanish pianist and composer.

Life
Born in Vitoria, Serrano spent his early youth in Madrid and received his musical training at the Madrid Conservatory, where he studied piano with Dámaso Zabalza, and harmony and composition with Emilio Arrieta. He himself soon began to teach and he joined the faculty after graduation. In 1894, he succeeded the late Emilio Arrieta as the chair of composition, which he held until 1920.  Besides teaching, he was a productive composer and served in many official capacities in the musical life of the Spanish Metropole. Most notably, he gave excellent performances as a pianist in chamber music concerts at the Spanish court and also directed the Teatro Real for some time, making him one of the most prominent faces of the music scene in Madrid. He died in Madrid aged 89.

Serrano was a well-rounded composer, who besides writing operas and zarzuelas, also left behind symphonies, chamber music, and works for piano.  He stood completely within the Spanish musical tradition of his time and was a confirmed representative of the Spanish national opera.

Selected works

Operas
 Mitridates
 Giovanna la pazza (Juana la loca), opera in four acts, premiered 1890 at the Teatro Real, Madrid
 Irene de Ortranto
 Gonzalo de Córdoba
 La maja de rumbo

Zarzuelas
 various juvenilia
 La Bejarana

Other
 Symphony in E-flat major
 La primera salida de Don Quijote, symphonic poem
 String quartet in D minor
 Canciones del hogar, for voice and orchestra

References

1850 births
1939 deaths
19th-century classical composers
19th-century Spanish composers
19th-century Spanish male musicians
20th-century classical composers
20th-century Spanish composers
20th-century Spanish male musicians
Male classical pianists
Male opera composers
Spanish classical composers
Spanish classical pianists
Spanish male classical composers
Spanish opera composers
Spanish Romantic composers